A puukko is a small traditional Finnish general purpose belt knife with a single curved cutting edge, solid hidden tang and, usually, a flat spine. 
Military models of puukko were popular in the Russian criminal underworld under the name "Finnish knife" or finka since the 20th century. The modified version were among the models on which the Soviet military knife NR-40 was based and which was informally called "finka".

Design 
The basic components of a puukko are a handle and a blade along with a sheath, which can usually be attached to a belt but sometimes to a shirt or coat button. The blade is usually short, typically no longer than the handle and can often be less than 4" (100 mm).

The flat grind makes the puukko a natural choice for slicing, cutting and whittling, and the flat spine allows the user to use a thumb or the other hand to bring more force to bear to the task at hand. Puukkos are most often used as carving tools for decorative and fire-making purposes and to clean fishers' and hunters' catches. Some puukko designs have a slightly upwards or downwards curved point, depending on what purpose the knife has. A hunting puukko's tip is often curved downwards to make skinning and opening the animal easier and less messy.  Fishermen's puukkos sometimes have a small dovetail on point to ease scraping off the innards of a fish.

Most puukkos have a slight shoulder but no ricasso (section of unsharpened blade nearest the handle) because the point where the edge ends and the handle begins is also the point where most power can be applied. A puukko typically has no finger guard, since it is primarily considered a cutting tool, not a stabbing weapon. Where the knife and the hand are expected to get wet, such as when the puukko is intended for gutting fish or game, a form of guard is carved into the handle. The traditional length of the puukko blade is the same as one's palm width, usually 90–120 mm. Carvers, huntsmen and leatherworkers favour shorter blades; woodworkers, carpenters and constructors longer. The blade of the historical väkipuukko may be up to 500 mm.  The väkipuukko more closely resembles a seax or short sword than true puukko, although it has given the form for the leuku of the sámi people.

Both factory-forged and hand-forged blades may be laminated: a thin layer of very hard steel (traditionally crucible steel made from limonite iron) is sandwiched between two layers of softer metal, which makes the blade less brittle and facilitates repeated sharpening. Before the 19th century, almost all iron in Finland was made from limonite on charcoal blast furnaces, which yield very pure and high-quality iron suitable for crucible steel. German silver steel was and is a popular core-steel material. Today both carbon steel and stainless steel are used. The blade can be lightened and strengthened by a fuller.

The traditional material for the handle is curly (masur) birch. Also great sallow root, birch bark, antler (especially elk and reindeer), scrimshaw and bone are used. Often the handle is made from various materials between spacers. Today, however, industrially made puukkos often have plastic handles.

In Finland and northern Scandinavia, many men put great pride in carving their puukko's handle. Over generations, this knife has become intimately tied to Nordic culture and, in one or another version, is part of many national costumes. A good puukko is equal parts artistic expression and tool. Making it requires many different skills: not only those of a bladesmith, but also those of a carver, a jeweller, a designer, and a leatherworker to make the sheath. Some fine puukkos have blades of pattern welded steel, and forging a blade using crucible steel was considered the hallmark of a master smith.

Usage 

Men's and women's puukkos do not significantly differ other than in size, as the handle of a puukko should match the hand of its owner. Women's puukkos are often shorter, with more decorated sheaths, and more oriented for working with foodstuffs. Both boy and girl Scouts consider the puukko their scouting symbol as well as a handy tool. 

In the Nordic countries, the puukko is an "everyday knife" used for everything from hunting, fishing, and gardening to opening boxes in a warehouse.  Many traditional puukkos are nowadays manufactured in industrial or near-industrial scale by many companies, Marttiini and Iisakki Järvenpää Oy being the most notable. Carrying sharp objects which could be used as weapons was banned in Finland in 1977. Since then, the puukko has lost much of its visibility in public places and been restricted to household work, hunting and fishing. In many industries the Mora knife which has a much cheaper construction is in use. The mora knife's handle is typically plastic, and the blade is either stainless steel or of laminated construction; harder steel which forms the edge is clad in softer steel. In Finnish, these knives also are usually referred to as puukko.

In Finland, carrying a knife in public without an acceptable (usually job-related) reason is prohibited and the only urban areas where open carry is an everyday sight are military garrisons. Although open carry is illegal, this is not vigorously enforced. Construction workers often go to diners with a puukko hanging from their overalls and in the rural and Northern parts of the country it is not uncommon to go shopping in village stores in hunting clothes, including a puukko. For instance, the deep ecologist, ornithologist and writer Pentti Linkola, who supported himself as a fisherman, often appeared in public wearing his puukko. 

A puukko was traditionally the only civilian item that could be openly carried as a part of a soldier's combat gear without breaching the Finnish Defence Forces regulations. A good puukko was considered an essential outdoorsman's tool, and thus vital for a soldier in the field. Puukkos proved to be good close combat weapons in the Winter War and Continuation War. Paradoxically, the Defence Forces do not have knives on general issue, due mainly to the puukko having been a highly personal item — and even today most conscripts follow the age-old tradition of bringing their own into service. It is a custom of Finnish conscripts, especially non-commissioned officers, and officer cadets to carry a decorated and/or engraved commemorative puukko of their military school or training course as a part of their uniform, not unlike a commemorative dagger. The bayonet of the Rk-62 assault rifle was designed to also function as a puukko, as was the rare bayonet for the M/39 Mosin-Nagant. 

In Finland, receiving a puukko as a gift is considered an honour, the idea being that the presenter is giving the recipient a tool which is essential for both woodworking and preparing food and as a weapon and that the presenter takes into account the well-being of the recipient.

Tapio Wirkkala, famous Finnish designer, designed a Puukko for Gutmann cutlery.

The puukko has also given the root for Finnish language verb puukottaa, "to stab (with a knife)" or literally "to knife".

See also 
 Sami knife
 Mora knife
 Yakutian knife
 Sgian-dubh
 Kukri
 Swiss Army knife

References

External links

 Finnish National Board of Antiques web-page about Tommi Puukko (in Finnish)
 Short documentary presenting traditional puukko making and Finnish knife master Kustaa Lammi (voice-over in English).

Blade weapons
Camping equipment
Finnish culture
Knives
Military knives